Ibuprofen/paracetamol, sold under the brand name Combiflam among others, is a fixed-dose combination of the medications, ibuprofen, a non-steroidal anti-inflammatory drug (NSAID), and paracetamol (acetaminophen).

It is available as a generic medication.

Medical uses 
Ibuprofen/paracetamol is indicated for the short term management of mild to moderate acute pain.

There is evidence that paracetamol combined with ibuprofen provides pain relief better than either medication used alone.

Adverse effects

Society and culture

Brand names 
The combination is available as Combiflam, Advil Dual Action with Acetaminophen, Ibupane, and Combogesic.

References

External links
 

Analgesics
Anti-inflammatory and antirheumatic products
Antipyretics
Combination drugs
Pfizer brands
GSK plc brands